Nirmal Ulhas Kulkarni (born 27 December 1978 in Mumbai, India) is a herpetologist, field ecologist, conservationist, and wildlife photographer. Director (Ecology) of Wildernest Nature Resort, an eco-tel in the Chorla Ghats (Goa), Chairman of the Mhadei Research Centre, Team Lead of Hypnale Research Station and promoter of HERPACTIVE, a study initiative on Herpetofauna. , he lives in Goa.

Early life
Nirmal's grandfather, Shantaram Yeshwant Kulkarni, often took him along on morning walks near their home in Mapusa, Goa, and taught him about the wildlife in their backyard. Their long morning walks together and evening tales were woven around the wildlife of the Konkan region.

Career

A Bachelor in Applied Arts from the Goa College of Art, Nirmal also holds a Masters in Environment and Ecology from the Indian Institute of Environment and Ecology, New Delhi. In addition, he has completed a year-long course in Basic Herpetology from the Bombay Natural History Society. These foundation courses, during which he met experts in the field like Ashok Captain, Bittu Sahgal, Varad Giri, Dr. Ulhas Karanth and Romulus Whitaker, enabled him to leapfrog from a snake handler and nature photographer to a herpetologist.

Related work
In 16 years of ground work with communities, field staff, researchers and students, Nirmal has experimented the combination of science, photography, activism and successfully linked field conservation, communities, livelihoods, natural resource management and environment protection, into a practical working model at Wildernest Nature Resort, Chorla Ghat, Goa and in the surrounding areas.

Nirmal has researched, mapped and recorded the secrets of the Mhadei Bio Region. He would often accompany renowned historian and environmentalist Mr. Rajendra Kerkar into deep forests, armed with just a camera. Those journeys whetted his appetite to know more about the region which was undocumented, and on several self-funded journeys he photo-documented the diversity of Mahdei – particularly lesser known animal species like reptiles and amphibians, insects and spiders.

By establishing the Mhadei Research Centre, the Northern Western Ghat's first independent field research station, he has established a single platform that trains young naturalists, brings communities and wildlife enthusiasts together, and documents the biodiversity of the region. His other base, The Hypnale Research Station at Kuveshi, Karnataka is considered as a beacon to follow for other field stations in the Western Ghats of India. Using these two bases, he has spent much of the last decade in inspiring young Turks to carry the mantle of conserving the Western Ghats for posterity.

Discoveries
Discovery of Ichthyophis davidi
Discovery of Gegeneophis goaensis
Discovery of Gegeneophis mhadeiensis
Range extension of sub-species of the pit viper (Peotobothrops jerdonii xanthomelas) - the Jerdon's Red spotted pit viper - from the Eaglenest Wildlife sanctuary in Arunachal Pradesh.
Discovery of Fegervarya gomantaki

Television and media
http://www.ndtv.com/video/player/news/nirmal-kulkarni-s-efforts-to-save-the-wildlife/237330

http://en.gaonconnection.com/india/campaign-to-create-awareness-about-threatened-python-species-in-india

Honors and awards
 Nehru Yuva Award for spreading conservation message amongst the Goan youth for over a decade, January 2001
 Mudra award for Ad campaign on wildlife protection by Goa College of Art, Goa University, April 2001
 Sarpamitra award by Indian Herpetological Society for contribution to Reptile conservation in the Sahyadris in general and Goa in particular, March 2002
 Ecologist of the year Award for ecology-related work in the state of Goa by ECHO Goa, an organization working for nature conservation, November 2005
 1st Place in State level Wildlife Photography contest in Nature Photography and Wildlife Photography competition organized by Forest Department, October 2008
 Gera Big Green Goenkar Award for work in wildlife conservation in Goa, June 2009
 Carl Zeiss Award for research and conservation initiatives, April 2011
 Nomination for Lokmat Gourav Puraskar 2012
 Karmaveer Puraskar November 2012.
 Vasundhara Award September 2013.
 Royal Bank of Scotland Earth Hero award 2013 in the ‘Inspire’ category in Delhi on 15 November 2013
 Sanctuary Asia Award 'Wind Under Wings' 2014

Conservation initiatives
Conservation for the sake of conserving not only wildlife habitats, but also forest community dominated landscapes near such ecological habitats, providing alternative and yet low-impact livelihoods has always been a long-term goal for Nirmal and has been achieved in many areas. While working with communities his team has supported young sparks and trained them to become entrepreneurs, skilled employment and eco-warriors in field. He has inspired volunteers, students and professionals to join in various capacities for field conservation by sacrificing time and toiling hard to collate data, conduct outreach programs and influence policy. His work has inspired and motivated many to choose conservation as full-time careers, while others have supported with resources and guidance.

As part of his scientific pursuit -
• He has headed and contributed to several research projects:
 National Biodiversity Strategy and Action Plan – studying man-reptile relationship in Sattari Taluka
 Sahyadri Ecologically Sensitive Area – documenting and compiling reptile species
 Indian Herpetological Society – creating a detailed database of snakes in Goa, Karnataka and Maharashtra for an e-guide
 Goa Forest Department – participation in three wildlife census
 Habitat monitoring and impact on the Olive Ridley Sea Turtles at Morjim beach, which ultimately led to the conservation of their nesting areas
 Mhadei Bachao Abhiyan – independent study on the impact the Mahdei river diversion will have on the Herpetofauna
 Compilation of basic biodiversity checklists of sacred groves in Sattari Taluka
 Archeological Society of India – documentation of heritage iconography in Sattari

He has significant discoveries to his credit -
 Goan caecilian (Gegeneophis goaensis) – Sattari District, Keri Village, Goa
 Mahdei caecilian (Gegeneophis mhadeiensis) – Chorla Village, Khanapur Taluka, Karnataka
 Chorla Giant striped Ichthyophis (Ichthyophis davidi) from Chorla and Castle Rock in Karnataka
 Range extension of sub-species of the Pit Viper (Protobothrops jerdonii xanthomelas) – the Jerdon's Red Spotted Pit Viper – Eaglenest Wildlife Sanctuary, Arunachal Pradesh

In addition, he has worked as a volunteer with the Wildlife Conservation Society for estimating prey for tigers in the Nagarhole Wildlife Sanctuary in Karnataka, and as a group team leader on a Conservation Programme at the Eaglenest Wildlife Sanctuary, Arunachal Pradesh. He is also involved in data collection and consultancy services on eco-tourism and wildlife research projects in six states, including Goa, Arunachal Pradesh and Uttaranchal. His experience in setting up and running Wildernest Nature Resort, an eco-tel in the heart of Chorla Ghats, holds him in good stead.

Nirmal's growing role as an activist can be seen in the successful ‘Save the Frogs’ campaign against the local consumption of Indian Bullfrogs, which he led along with co-campaigner Clinton Vaz and the Goa Forest Department. The campaign included awareness-cum-law enforcement activities. He was also part of a team that worked on conserving the Bhimgad Forests in Karnataka. Their efforts ultimately led to the creation of the Bhimgad Wildlife Sanctuary. The efforts by his team under Nirmal's leadership also have helped declare the Mahdei Wildlife Sanctuary as a Proposed Tiger Reserve and bring attention to the Mahdei Dam Project that is slated to irreversibly damage prime Western Ghats habitat.

He is associated with and connected to multiple state and national-level organizations which focus on ecological and wildlife conservation. Most notably, he is affiliated to:
 Goa State Wildlife Advisory Board
 Madras Crocodile Bank Trust and Centre for Herpetology
 Goa Heritage Action Group
 Indian Bird Conservation Network and Goa State Bird Conservation Network
 Western Ghats Core Group – Goa State
 Bombay Natural History Society
 Mahdei Bachao Abhiyan
 Sahyadri Ecologically Sensitive Area (SESA) Committee
 Katraj Snake Park and Uttara's Ark, a Wildlife rehabilitation center cum snake park at Katraj, Pune
 TigerLink network, a national network formed to conserve the tiger and its habitat
 Conservation and Livelihoods network, a network formed to protect community rights as well as natural habitats in the country
 Indian Herpetological Society, a body working in the field of reptile conservation in the country
 Vivekanand Environment Awareness Brigade, an NGO involved in spreading conservation awareness in the state

He was assisted, and mentored by stalwarts in the field of biodiversity research and documentation, most notably Dr. Claude Alvares, Dr. Manoj Borkar, Dr. G K Bhatt and Dr. M. K. Janarthanan.

Nirmal and his team work with communities, both urban and rural, with youth and children, with professionals and tourists and in all these target groups the approaches are different and depend on issues as well as needs. The confidence building measures include providing sustainable livelihoods to over 200 families directly or indirectly, reviving age old green traditions, documenting intellectual property issues and providing platforms for communities as well as individuals to rise. The Children's Outreach Programme is the backbone of their initiatives and touches 30 schools across 3 states, which has been acknowledged on a national level by wildlife conservation groups as well as by the media.

Nirmal Kulkarni was invited to the Philippines in August 2013 on a series of lectures and talks. He was invited to speak on ‘Engaging youth for conservation through field research training in India’ by the University of Cebu and the KAS Environmental Law Talks committee. He was also a speaker at "Nurturing Biodiversity Protection among Children" that was organized by the Philippines Earth Justice Center and Dept of Education, City of Cebu Province.
Nirmal also engaged with Forest stewards of the Tabunan forests and with Councilor archival at the Eco House on issues ranging from conservation and recycling to wildlife documentation. He was also a speaker at the Forum on Eco Tourism that was organized by Cebu City government and Grassroots Travel.
Nirmal was also interviewed on a local television channel by the Cebu lady lawyer's association and his work was covered in local newspapers.

While capacity building in rural areas is the focus, in urban areas the community is urged to look around their own surroundings through a network of social and visual media campaigns, through a volunteer network and of course through personal interactions. While parallels are drawn, it is essential to note that humans and wildlife do have specific needs and to balance these, we address them by working with planners and policy makers. This aims at helping communities as well as forests in the long run.

His efforts in the Goa State have been covered by CNN-IBN, BBC Open Country, NDTV, Zee News, Sahara News, ETV Marathi, Star News and other local media. Also, his personal databank of professional images of Goa's hinterland and diversity is used by various NGOs, individuals, and institutions in the state as well as nationally for education and creating awareness.

Books

Nirmal has authored The Goan Jungle Book which is aimed at educating students in particular and the Goan populace in general about Goa's lesser known wildlife.

References 

Indian ecologists
Scientists from Mumbai
1978 births
Living people